The Battle of Tarinkot took place in 2001 during the War in Afghanistan. On November 14, 2001, ODA 574 and Hamid Karzai inserted into Uruzgan Province via 4 MH-60K helicopters with a small force of guerrillas. In response to the approach of Karzai's force, the inhabitants of the town of Tarinkot revolted and expelled their Taliban administrators. Karzai traveled to Tarinkot to meet with the town elders. While he was there, the Taliban marshaled a force of 500 men to retake Tarinkot. Karzai's small force plus the American contingent, which consisted of US Army Special Forces from ODA 574 and their US Air Force Combat Controller, Tech Sergeant Alex Yoshimoto, were deployed in front of the town to block their advance. Relying heavily on close air support directed by Yoshimoto, the American/Afghan force managed to halt the Taliban advance and drive them away from the town.

The defeat of the Taliban at Tarinkot was an important victory for Karzai, who used the victory to recruit more men to his fledgling guerrilla band. His force would grow in size to a peak of around 800 men. On November 30, they left Tarinkot and began advancing on Kandahar.

The story has been told in  The Only Thing Worth Dying For, by Eric Blehm, detailing the experiences of Operational Detachment Alpha 574, a U.S. Army Special Forces ODA.

References

2001 in Afghanistan
War in Afghanistan (2001–2021)
November 2001 events in Asia
Tarinkot
Operations involving American special forces
History of Urozgan Province

Battles in 2001